Cottus hangiongensis is a species of freshwater ray-finned fish belonging to the family Cottidae, the typical sculpins. It is found from Primorsky Krai in Russia to the Korean Peninsula. It reaches a maximum length of 15.0 cm. It prefers clear and cold water streams with sandy and gravelly bottoms.

References

Fish of Russia
Cottus (fish)
Taxa named by Tamezo Mori
Fish described in 1930